Echo Lake is a glacial tarn in the Ruby Mountains, in Elko County in the northeastern part of the state of Nevada. It is the major source of Echo Creek, which after exiting the mountains merges with other streams to form the South Fork of the Humboldt River.

References 

Lakes of Elko County, Nevada
Ruby Mountains
Lakes of Nevada